Daniel Garwe is a Zimbabwean politician. He was appointed to Zimbabwe's Cabinet in November 2019 as the first Minister of the National Housing and Social Amenities. As minister, he is overseeing a public-private partnership housing project to create housing for thousands. 

Garwe was elected to the country's National Assembly in 2018, representing the constituency of Murehwa North. 

Garwe worked in the construction industry before joining politics and owns Planet Building. He also plays an ownership role in Hastream Enterprises (Pvt) Ltd, Macheke Motors (Pvt) Ltd t/a Sebakwe Range Farm; Kudakawashe and Tafadzwa Garwe Family Trust.

References

21st-century Zimbabwean politicians
Living people
Year of birth missing (living people)